Hamilton County is a county in the U.S. state Nebraska. As of the 2020 United States Census, the population was 9,429. Its county seat is Aurora. The county was named for Alexander Hamilton, the first Secretary of the Treasury in the new United States government.

Hamilton County is included in the Grand Island, NE Metropolitan Statistical Area.

In the Nebraska license plate system, Hamilton County is represented by the prefix 28 (it had the 28th-largest number of vehicles registered in the county when the license plate system was established in 1922).

History
The first permanent settlers arrived in Hamilton County in 1866. Hamilton County was created in 1867, and was organized in 1870. It was named for Alexander Hamilton.

Geography
The Platte River flows northeastward along the northwest side of Hamilton County, forming the northwestern boundary line with Merrick County.

Major highways
  Interstate 80
  U.S. Highway 34
  Nebraska Highway 2
  Nebraska Highway 14
  Nebraska Highway 66

Adjacent counties

 Polk County – northeast
 York County – east
 Clay County – south
 Adams County – southwest
 Hall County – west
 Merrick County – north

Protected areas

 Gadwall State Wildlife Management Area
 Nelson Federal Waterfowl Production Area
 Pintail State Wildlife Management Area
 Rainwater Basin Wildlife Management District
 Springer Federal Waterfowl Production Area
 Troester Federal Waterfowl Production Area
 Deep Well State Wildlife Management Area

Demographics

As of the 2000 United States Census, there were 9,403 people, 3,503 households, and 2,676 families residing in the county. The population density was 17 people per square mile (7/km2). There were 3,850 housing units at an average density of 7 per square mile (3/km2). The racial makeup of the county was 98.43% White, 0.18% Black or African American, 0.12% Native American, 0.22% Asian, 0.49% from other races, and 0.56% from two or more races. 1.14% of the population were Hispanic or Latino of any race.

There were 3,503 households, out of which 37.30% had children under the age of 18 living with them, 67.40% were married couples living together, 5.90% had a female householder with no husband present, and 23.60% were non-families. 21.10% of all households were made up of individuals, and 10.10% had someone living alone who was 65 years of age or older. The average household size was 2.64 and the average family size was 3.07.

The county population contained 29.10% under the age of 18, 5.90% from 18 to 24, 26.50% from 25 to 44, 23.20% from 45 to 64, and 15.30% who were 65 years of age or older. The median age was 38 years. For every 100 females there were 99.40 males. For every 100 females age 18 and over, there were 96.10 males.

The median income for a household in the county was $40,277, and the median income for a family was $45,659. Males had a median income of $29,238 versus $20,308 for females. The per capita income for the county was $17,590. About 5.90% of families and 7.50% of the population were below the poverty line, including 9.80% of those under age 18 and 5.40% of those age 65 or over.

Communities

City
 Aurora (county seat)

Villages

 Giltner
 Hampton
 Hordville
 Marquette
 Phillips
 Stockham

Census-designated place
 Overland

Politics
Hamilton County voters have long been reliably Republican. In only one national election since 1916 has the county selected the Democratic Party candidate.

See also
 National Register of Historic Places listings in Hamilton County, Nebraska

References

External links
 Hamilton County Online

 
Nebraska counties
1870 establishments in Nebraska
Populated places established in 1870